Lumbari Island is one of the Solomon Islands, near Rendova Island  in the Western Province.

It was the base of operations for PT boats such as John F. Kennedy's PT 109

See also
 
 08°24.182'S, 157°18.615'E.

Islands of the Solomon Islands
Western Province (Solomon Islands)